San Cibrao das Viñas is a municipality in the Province of Ourense in the Galicia region of north-west Spain. It located in the north-west of the province.

References  

Municipalities in the Province of Ourense